The British 200 metres hurdles athletics champions (women) and 220 yards hurdles athletics champions (men) covers the Amateur Athletic Club Championships  from 1952 until 1972.

Where an international athlete won the AAA Championships the highest ranking UK athlete is considered the National Champion in this list. The events were discontinued after the 1962 (men) and 1972 (women) editions.

Past winners

nc = not contested

References

200 metres hurdles
British
British Athletics Championships